Keefe is both a surname and a masculine given name. Notable people with the name include:

Surname:
Adam Keefe (basketball) (born 1970), American basketball player
Adam Keefe (ice hockey) (born 1984), Canadian ice hockey player
Anne Keefe (theatre director), American theatre director
Bobby Keefe (1882–1964), American baseball player
Brian Keefe, American basketball coach
Daniel Keefe (1852–1929), American labor leader
Dave Keefe (1897–1978), American baseball player
David Keefe (born 1957), English footballer
Denis Keefe (born 1958), British ambassador to Serbia
Dylan Keefe (born 1970), American musician
Emmett Keefe (1893–1965), American football player
Frank Bateman Keefe (1887–1952), American politician
George Keefe (1867–1935), American baseball player
James Keefe (18th century), Irish Roman Catholic bishop
Jim Keefe (born 1965), American comic strip cartoonist
John Keefe (baseball) (1867–1937), American baseball player
John Keefe (actor) (born 1979), American actor
John B. Keefe (1928–1997), American lawyer, judge, and politician
Melinda H. Keefe, American chemist
Michael Edwin Keefe (1844–1933), Canadian politician
Mike Keefe (born 1946), American editorial cartoonist
P. J. Keefe, American football coach
Patrick Radden Keefe (born 1976), American writer and investigative journalist
Peter Keefe (1952–2010), American television producer
Rob Keefe (born 1980), American Arena Football League player and coach
Sheldon Keefe (born 1980), Canadian ice hockey player
Simon Keefe (born 1968), British musicologist and author
Stephen Keefe (born 1945), American politician and chemist
Susan Keefe, American anthropologist and author
Tim Keefe (1857–1933), American baseball player
William John Keefe (1873–1955), American judge
Zena Keefe (1896–1977), American actress

Given name:
Keefe Brasselle (1923–1981), American actor, television producer and writer
Keefe Cato (born 1957), American baseball player

Fictional characters
Keefe Sencen, a character in the Keeper Of The Lost Cities book series by Shannon Messenger

See also
O'Keefe
O'Keeffe

Masculine given names
Surnames of Irish origin
Anglicised Irish-language surnames